Serge Bolley (born 3 December 1944) is a French former professional cyclist.

Biography
Serge was born in Villeurbanne, France on December 3, 1944. He participated in three Tour de France editions.

Career
In addition to his stage victory in the Vuelta a Mallorca in 1967, he took third place in the fourth stage of the 1968 Tour de France. In 1969, he finished second in the fifth stage of the Tour of Spain. He was teammate of Jacques Anquetil. His last result was 39th place in stage 14b during the 1972 Tour de France.

Major results

1966
 2nd Overall Circuit de la Sarthe
 2nd Tour du Vaucluse
1967
 1st Stage 1 Vuelta a Mallorca
1970
 1st Stage 1 Volta a Catalunya

Grand Tour results

Tour de France
 1968: 59th
 1969: DNF (2nd stage)
 1972: DNF (16th stage)

Vuelta a España
 1967: 68th
 1969: 36th

Giro d'Italia
 1968: 23rd

References

External links
 

1944 births
Living people
French male cyclists
People from Villeurbanne
Sportspeople from Lyon Metropolis
Cyclists from Auvergne-Rhône-Alpes